The women's discus throw at the 2016 IPC Athletics European Championships was held at the Stadio Olimpico Carlo Zecchini in Grosseto from

Medalists

See also
List of IPC world records in athletics

References

Discus throw
2016 in women's athletics
Discus throw at the World Para Athletics European Championships